The 27th Filmfare Awards South ceremony honoring the winners of the best of South Indian cinema in 1979 was an event held on July 6, 1980, at Music Academy Madras.

The president of this year's function was Judge of the Supreme Court P. N. Bhagwati. The chief guest of the evening was L. V. Prasad.

Awards

Kannada cinema

Malayalam cinema

Tamil cinema

Telugu cinema

Awards Presentation

 Aarathi (Best Film Kannada) Received Award from Amol Palekar
 V. V. Babu (Best Film Malayalam)  Received Award from Moushumi Chatterjee
 K. Murari (Best Film Telugu) Received Award from Sheela
 Durai (Best Film Tamil) Received Award from Jayasudha
 Puttanna Kanagal (Best Director Kannada) Received Award from Vidhubala
 Bharathan (Best Director Malayalam) Received Award from Jayachithra
 Dasari Narayana Rao (Best Director Telugu) Received Award from Jeetendra
 Mahendran (Best Director Tamil) Received Award from Latha
 Aarathi (Best Actress Kannada) Received Award from Shashi Kapoor
 Srividya (Best Actress Malayalam) Received Award from Kamal Haasan
 Sujatha (Best Actress Telugu) Received Award from Jayalalithaa
 Prema Menon Receives her daughter Shoba's Award (Best Actress Tamil) from Sowcar Janaki
 Amol Palekar Receives Anant Nag Award (Best Actor Kannada) from Deepa
 Prathap K. Pothan (Best Actor Malayalam) Received Award from Rekha
 Sobhan Babu (Best Actor Telugu) Received Award from Rati Agnihotri
 Sivakumar (Best Actor Tamil) Received Award from K. R. Vijaya

References

 Filmfare Magazine 1980.

General

External links
 
 

Filmfare Awards South